The Fendalton by-election of 1967 was a by-election for the electorate of Fendalton on 15 April 1967 during the 35th New Zealand Parliament.

It was held the same day as another by-election in Petone.

Background
The by-election resulted from the death of the previous member the Hon Harry Lake on 21 February 1967; Lake had been Minister of Finance since 1960, a rapid rise to an important ministerial post. He died suddenly of a heart attack aged 55 years.

Candidates
Labour
There were two candidates for the Labour Party nomination.

Brian Brooks, a union secretary and industrial law lecturer at the University of Canterbury

Barclay was selected. He had contested Fendalton for Labour at both of the previous two general elections.

National
There were four nominees for the National Party candidacy.

Eric Holland, past chairman of the Fendalton Electorate Committee and deputy-chairman National's Canterbury-Westland division

Holland was chosen as the National Party's candidate after winning a ballot of 180 party members from the electorate. His father Sidney Holland had previously represented Fendalton from 1946 until 1957 and was Prime Minister from 1949 to 1957 when he retired.

Social Credit
The Social Credit Party selected Joseph John Forster, an employee at the North Canterbury Hospital Board, as its candidate. Forster had contested Fendalton for Social Credit at the 1960 and 1966 elections.

Others
The Liberal Party also contemplated standing a candidate, though the party executive ultimately decided against it.

Results
The following table gives the election results:

The by-election was won by Eric Holland, also of the National Party. Holland was the son of former prime minister Sidney Holland. Despite being a safe National seat, the election night results had a 67-vote majority to Labour's candidate Bruce Barclay, the shock result prompted Leader of the Opposition Norman Kirk to declare that National had lost its mandate to govern. However after 1,300 special votes were counted National did manage to hold the seat by just 286 votes a swing of over 5% to Labour.

Notes

References

Fendalton 1967
1967 elections in New Zealand
Politics of Christchurch
1960s in Christchurch
April 1967 events in New Zealand